Ban Pong may refer to:
Ban Pong District, Ratchaburi Province, Thailand
Ban Pong, Ratchaburi, central town of Ban Pong district, Thailand
Ban Pong Railway Station
Ban Pong, Phrao, subdistrict of Phrao District, Chiang Mai Province, Thailand
Ban Pong, Hang Dong, subdistrict of Hang Dong District, Chiang Mai Province, Thailand
Ban Pong, Ngao, subdistrict of Ngao District, Lampang Province, Thailand
Ban Pong, Wiang Pa Pao, subdistrict of Wiang Pa Pao district, Chiang Rai Province, Thailand
Ban Pong, Sung Men, subdistrict of Sung Men District, Phrae Province, Thailand
Ban Pong (commune), a commune in Cambodia
Ban Pong, a village in Bang Pong commune